Anarsia tortuosella is a moth in the family Gelechiidae. It was described by Hans Georg Amsel in 1967. It is found in Pakistan and Afghanistan.

References

tortuosella
Moths described in 1967
Moths of Asia